William Francis Donoghue Jr. (7 September 1921 – 4 April 2002, Irvine, California) was an American mathematician, specializing in analysis.

Biography
Donoghue received in 1951 his PhD from the University of Wisconsin–Madison. His dissertation The Bounded Closure of Locally Convex Spaces was written under the supervision of William Frederick Eberlein. Donoghue taught and did research at the University of Kansas, New York University, and Michigan State University, before he became in 1965 a professor at the University of California, Irvine.

For the academic year 1958/59 he was a Guggenheim Fellow in Sweden. For four months in 1962 he was a visiting professor at the University of Paris. He spent the academic year 1972/73 on sabbatical at the University of Lund.

On January 26, 1974, he married Grace Koo in Orange County, California.

Selected publications

Articles

Books

References

20th-century American mathematicians
University of Wisconsin–Madison alumni
University of California, Irvine faculty
1921 births
2002 deaths
American expatriates in France
American expatriates in Sweden
University of Kansas people
New York University people
Michigan State University people